Sangli Lok Sabha constituency is one of the 48 Lok Sabha (parliamentary) constituencies in Maharashtra state in western India.

Assembly segments
Presently, Sangli Lok Sabha constituency comprises six Vidhan Sabha (legislative assembly) segments. These segments (along with their constituency number and reservation status) are:

Members of Parliament

^bypoll

Election results

General elections 2019

General elections 2014

General elections 2009

See also
 Sangli district
 List of Constituencies of the Lok Sabha

Notes

References

External links
Sangli lok sabha  constituency election 2019 results details

Lok Sabha constituencies in Maharashtra
Sangli district